Tubon may refer to:

 Tubon, Ramsar, Iran
 Tubon, Nashta, Tonekabon County, Iran
 A tubular electric organ developed